Queen Elizabeth Barracks may refer to:
Queen Elizabeth Barracks, Church Crookham, Hampshire, England
Queen Elizabeth Barracks, Suva,  Fiji
Queen Elizabeth Barracks, Strensall, North Yorkshire, England